The following highways are numbered 288:

Japan
 Japan National Route 288

Sweden
  between Uppsala, Gimo and Östhammar

United States
 Arizona State Route 288
 Georgia State Route 288
 Kentucky Route 288
 Maryland Route 288
 Minnesota State Highway 288 (former)
 Montana Secondary Highway 288
 New Mexico State Road 288
 New York State Route 288 (former)
 Ohio State Route 288
 Pennsylvania Route 288
 South Carolina Highway 288
 Tennessee State Route 288
 Texas State Highway 288
 Texas State Highway Loop 288
 Farm to Market Road 288 (Texas)
 Utah State Route 288 (former)
 Virginia State Route 288